Events in the year 1831 in Belgium.

Incumbents

Monarch – Leopold I (from 21 July)
Head of government – Etienne Constantin de Gerlache (27 February–10 March), Joseph Lebeau (10 March–24 July), Félix de Muelenaere (from 24 July)

Events
February
 3 February – Prince Louis, Duke of Nemours, elected king of the Belgians but declined the honour.
 5 February – Jan van Speyk explodes his gunboat in the port of Antwerp
 7 February – National Congress approves the Constitution of Belgium
 27 February – Etienne Constantin de Gerlache takes office as head of government

March
 10 March – Joseph Lebeau replaces Etienne Constantin de Gerlache as head of government

June
 26 June – At the Conference of London the five great powers (Austria, Britain, France, Prussia, Russia) finalise the Treaty of the Eighteen Articles, an unsuccessful peace proposal for Belgium and the Netherlands

July
 12 July – Leopold, Prince of Coburg, elected king of the Belgians.
 19 July – Leopold arrives in Brussels.
 21 July – Leopold sworn in as king of the Belgians.
 24 July – Félix de Muelenaere replaces Joseph Lebeau as head of government

August
 2–12 August – Ten Days' Campaign – Dutch attempt to re-establish rule over Belgium fails, but Dutch forces retain control of Antwerp Citadel.
 8 August – Battle of Hasselt
 12 August – Battle of Leuven
 29 August – Belgian general election, 1831, first elections for the Belgian Parliament

Publications
 Almanach de poche de Bruxelles (Brussels, M.-E. Rampelbergh)
 Joseph Jean De Smet, Nouvelle géographie, second edition (Ghent, Vanryckgem-Hovaere)
 Auguste Voisin, Guide des voyageurs dans la ville de Gand, ou Notice historique sur cette ville, ses monumens, ses institutions, sa statistique, etc. (Ghent, Louis De Busscher)

Births
 11 April – Euphrosine Beernaert, landscape painter (died 1901)
 12 April – Constantin Meunier, painter and sculptor (died 1905)
 25 April – Edmond Reusens, archaeologist (died 1903)
 8 July – Antoine-Félix Bouré, monumental sculptor (died 1883)
 29 July – Léopold Harzé, sculptor (died 1893)
 26 September – François-Joseph Scohy, archaeologist (died 1881)
 30 September – Joseph Delboeuf, psychologist (died 1896)

Deaths

 15 January – François de Méan (born 1756), archbishop of Mechelen
 27 March – Jean Kickx (born 1775), botanist and mineralogist
 5 April – Pierre Léonard Vander Linden (born 1797), entomologist
 21 November – Marie Anne Simonis (born 1758), industrialist

References

 
Belgium
Years of the 19th century in Belgium
1830s in Belgium
Belgium